ʻAbd al-Aḥad (ALA-LC romanization of ) is an Arabic male given name. It is built from the Arabic words ʻabd and al-Aḥad, one of the names of God in Islam. It is listed in the Qur'an, which give rise to the Muslim theophoric names. It means "servant of the only One". Abd al-Ahad is also common among Arabic-speaking Christians, particularly Syriac Catholics -- several of whose clergymen, including the late patriarch Ignatius Peter VIII Abdul-Ahad, have borne the name.

It may refer to:
'Abd al-Ahad Khan
Abd ul-Aḥad Dāwūd, name adopted by David Benjamin Keldani (1867–c.1940), Persian Catholic priest who converted to Islam
Abdul-Ahad Dawood Tappouni, birth name of Ignatius Gabriel I Tappuni (1879–1968), patriarch of the Syriac Catholic Church
Abdul Ahad Wardak (c.1880–1949), Afghan politician
Abdul Ahad Azad (1903–1948), Kashmiri poet
Abdul Ahad (music director) (1918–1996), Bangladeshi lyricist and music director
Abdul Ahad Karzai, (1922–1999), Afghan politician
Ignatius Peter VIII Abdalahad (born 1930), patriarch of the Syriac Catholic Church
Abdul'ahat Abdulrixit (born 1942), chairman of the Xinjiang Uyghur Autonomous Region in China
Abdul Ahad Momand (born 1959), Afghan-German cosmonaut
Ghaith Abdul-Ahad (born 1975), Iraqi journalist
Abdulahad Malik (born 1986), Indian cricketer
Shah Abdul Ahad Afzali, Afghan politician
Abdel Ahad Gamal El Din, Egyptian politician

References

Arabic masculine given names